The 2004 United States presidential election in New Hampshire took place on November 2, 2004, and was part of the 2004 United States presidential election. Voters chose four representatives, or electors to the Electoral College, who voted for president and vice president.

New Hampshire was won by Democratic nominee John Kerry by a 1.4% margin of victory. Prior to the election, most news organizations considered it as a swing state. Traditionally a more Republican leaning state of the heavily Democratic New England region, it was the only state in all of the Northeast to vote Republican in 2000. The state is considered to be more fiscally conservative than its neighbors in New England. However, like the rest of New England, it is considerably more liberal on social issues, which benefits Democratic candidates. New Hampshire was the only state that Bush won in the 2000 presidential election but lost in the 2004 presidential election. Kerry's victory in the state, off the heels of Bush's statewide victory in the 2000 presidential election, makes New Hampshire the only state in the union to vote for the loser of the national popular vote in both 2000 and 2004.

Bush became the first Republican to ever win a presidential election without carrying New Hampshire. He was also the second consecutive Republican president (after his father) to lose New Hampshire in his second election after winning it in his first. This was also the first time since 1848 that a losing Democrat would carry New Hampshire, and the first time since 1976 that the state would back the losing candidate in a presidential election. It also remains the only time in history that a Republican has won the popular vote without carrying New Hampshire.

Primaries

Democratic primary

The 2004 New Hampshire Democratic Primary was held on January 27, 2004. Taking place 8 days after the Iowa caucuses, it marked the second contest to take place during the Democratic party's 2004 primary season, as well as the first actual primary to take place.

Polling
Primary polling taken by American Research Group during the last few days of campaigning (January 23 to January 27, 2004) showed that former New Hampshire poll leader as well as national leader Howard Dean was steadily gaining ground to catch up to now front-runner John Kerry.

Gathered from ARG's 2004 NH Democratic Tracking Poll

Margin of Error +/- 4

Tracking polling showed that Dean had been catching up to Kerry in the days before the primary, cutting Kerry's 18 point lead to 10 points in a matter of days. With Dean dropping and Kerry rising, it became apparent that the battle for 1st place in New Hampshire would be close. Also, for third place, Wesley Clark, John Edwards and Joe Lieberman were the only ones fighting for third. With Clark and Edwards both taking hits going into the primary, a Lieberman on the rise, the fight for 1st place and third place, according to polls would be intense.

Results
As results began to come in during Primary night, it became apparent Kerry had won the primary and was promptly projected the winner by several media outlets. Dean finished in second place. Clark and Edwards were in a dead-lock for third place, with both candidates at 12% during the night. Earlier returns showed Lieberman in a stronger position to tie with Clark and Edwards, allowing him to declare to his supporters that it was "a three-way split decision for third place."

As final results were being tallied, Kerry won the primary with 84,277 votes and 38%, Dean finished second, with 57,761 and 26%, and Clark narrowly defeated Edwards for third place, with 27,314 votes and 12%. Lieberman had fallen back in the count and didn't even reach 10%.

Exit Polling

Source: CNN.com 2004 Primaries

Kerry won huge margins of support amongst almost all constituencies, with his only weak point amongst Republicans, who made up 4% of the voting block and was Lieberman's strongest point. Dean repeatedly came distant second or third for almost all categories of voters. Edwards defeated Clark amongst male voters as well as voters under 65, but only by a very tiny margin. Lieberman finished in a distant third in almost all categories except for Republicans, in which he nearly defeated John Kerry.

Campaign

Predictions
There were 12 news organizations who made state-by-state predictions of the election. Here are their last predictions before election day.

 D.C. Political Report: Slight Democrat
 Associated Press: Toss-up
 CNN: Kerry
Cook Political Report: Toss-up
 Newsweek: Toss-up
New York Times: Toss-up
 Rasmussen Reports: Toss-up
 Research 2000: Toss-up
Washington Post: Battleground
Washington Times: Battleground
Zogby International: Kerry
 Washington Dispatch: Kerry

Polling
Pre-election polling was back and forth, with no clear indication who would end up winning the state. The final 3 polls averaged Kerry leading 48% to 47%, with the undecided voters, making up just 3%, deciding the election.

Fundraising
Bush raised $598,474. Kerry raised $766,720.

Advertising and visits
Bush visited the state 6 times, while Kerry visited the state 4 times. Each campaign spent between $100,000 to $300,000 each week.

Analysis
New Hampshire, historically considered to be a more conservative state compared to the rest of New England, had by the early 2000s become a swing state in presidential elections, having voted for Democrat Bill Clinton twice in the 1990s but narrowly choosing Republican George W. Bush in 2000. However the state began heavily trending Democratic after 2000. Bush's approval ratings were consistently below 50% in 2004. Also, polling in the state consistently showed Kerry leading, and with between 47% to 50% of the vote.

On election day, Kerry won with just over 50% of the vote, with a small margin of victory, as expected from the polls. Major factors include Bush's lower approval ratings and just 1% who voted for third-party candidates, unlike 2000 when over 4% of the people voted for an independent. Kerry won 6 of the 10 counties. Most of the counties were won and lost by small margins. Kerry's key to victory was winning Cheshire County with over 59%. Bush's best performance was in Belknap County, which he won with over 55% and carrying every single town. Bush won New Hampshire's 1st congressional district, and Kerry won New Hampshire's 2nd congressional district. This was also the first presidential election since 1968 when Coos County would back the losing candidate (thus making Bush the first Republican since 1968 to win the White House without carrying this county), and only the second time since 1892 when that would occur overall. This would later be repeated when Donald Trump won the county over Joe Biden in 2020 despite losing the presidential election that year. Bush became the first ever Republican to win the White House without carrying Sullivan County.

Results

By county

Counties that flipped from Republican to Democratic
 Coös County (largest municipality: Berlin)
 Sullivan County (largest municipality: Claremont)

By congressional district
Bush and Kerry each won a congressional district. Kerry won a district held by a Republican.

Electors

Technically the voters of NH cast their ballots for electors: representatives to the Electoral College. NH is allocated 4 electors because it has 2 congressional districts and 2 senators. All candidates who appear on the ballot or qualify to receive write-in votes must submit a list of 4 electors, who pledge to vote for their candidate and his or her running mate. Whoever wins the majority of votes in the state is awarded all 4 electoral votes. Their chosen electors then vote for president and vice president. Although electors are pledged to their candidate and running mate, they are not obligated to vote for them. An elector who votes for someone other than his or her candidate is known as a faithless elector.

The electors of each state and the District of Columbia met on December 13, 2004, to cast their votes for president and vice president. The Electoral College itself never meets as one body. Instead the electors from each state and the District of Columbia met in their respective capitols.

The following were the members of the Electoral College from the state. All 4 were pledged for Kerry/Edwards:

 Jeanne Shaheen
 Peter Burling
 Judy Reardon
 James Ryan

See also
 Presidency of George W. Bush
 United States presidential elections in New Hampshire

References

New Hampshire
2004
2004 New Hampshire elections